Imagination is the debut studio album by Australian singer songwriter, Deni Hines.

At the ARIA Music Awards of 1996, Imagination was nominated for two awards - ARIA Award for Best Female Artist losing to "Come On" by Christine Anu and ARIA Award for Breakthrough Artist – Album losing to Tu-Plang by Regurgitator.

The album was released in Europe in 1998 under the title Pay Attention.

Track listings
1996 track listing

1997 re-release
 "It's Alright" - 4:16
 "Make It Happen" - 5:10
 "I Like The Way"	- 4:34
 "Do You Feel The Way I Do" - 4:13
 "It's Not Over" - 4:21
 "Like A River" - 4:28
 "Delicious" - 6:03
 "Too High" - 5:21
 "Go Slow" - 5:30
 "Joy" - 5:51
 "Personal" - 4:47
 "Somethin' About You" - 3:12
 "Imagination" - 3:25
 "I'm Not In Love" - 5:40

Charts
Imagination debuted and peaked at number 15 in June 1996. The album remained in the top 50 for 10 weeks.

References

1996 debut albums
Deni Hines albums
Mushroom Records albums